Gilbert William Galvan Jr. (born  1957) is an American bank robber. Having spent many of his adult years in prison, Galvan fled to Canada where he assumed the name Robert Lee Whiteman and began a three-year spree robbing banks and jewelry stores. The media dubbed him the Flying Bandit and the Phantom Bandit. Galvan's exploits were the subject of a 1996 true crime book by Robert Knuckle, which was adapted into the 2022 film Bandit.

Criminal career 

In the United States, Galvan had embezzled from Western Union. In 1984, he escaped from prison in Michigan and fled to Pembroke, Ontario, where he took a new name, Robert Lee Whiteman, and claimed to be a computer salesman. He began robbing banks in 1984.

Galvan's method was to wear a disguise, carry a weapon (which he never fired during any of the robberies), and pass a note to a teller. Galvan would charter planes to travel to a main terminal, where he would transfer to an Air Canada flight. With this method, his luggage was transferred to the connecting flight without going through security, permitting him to transport the weapons he would use in his robberies. In some of his jewelry store robberies, Galvan had an accomplice.

Galvan robbed banks in every Canadian province except Prince Edward Island and Newfoundland. His takes ranged from $600 cash in his first robbery to $1.2 million in jewelry. His thefts totaled $251,333 in cash and more than $2 million in jewelry. Galvan was dubbed the Flying Bandit by Canadian media during his crime spree robbing banks and jewelry stores.

When Galvan and an accomplice stole $1.2 million in jewelry in Vancouver, they left behind a gun which police traced to a break-in in Ottawa.

A long-term investigation by police into stolen goods in the Ottawa area came across a man named Robert Whiteman fencing jewelry. Police determined that Whiteman had no social insurance number or birth certificate, but found a trail of credit-card receipts in that name. Comparing credit-card receipts and airline receipts led police to surveille Whiteman's residence in Pembroke where they gathered enough evidence to charge him.

When he was arrested in 1987, Galvan said he had planned to confess to his wife and move with her to the Turks and Caicos Islands.

Galvan pled guilty to 59 armed robberies in Canada, plus 17 related charges. In 1988, Galvan was sentenced to 20 years. He was deported from Canada to prison in Wisconsin in 1994 and released in 1998. After his release, he robbed a bank in McHenry, Illinois in December 2000 and April 2001, for which he was sentenced to 15 years. In December, 2014, Galvan was released from federal custody.

In May, 2015, Galvan was arrested for retail theft in Barrington, Illinois, and was sentenced to 50 days in jail.

In popular culture 

Robert Knuckle published The Flying Bandit, Bringing Down Canada's Most Daring Armed Robber in 1996.

In 2005, the Canadian true crime series Masterminds (Canadian TV series) featured Galvan's exploits in episode 39.

Galvan's crimes were fictionalized in the 2022 film Bandit, starring Josh Duhamel who met with Galvan during filming. Duhamel said Galvan told him that he had "wanted to create a life and family, and his only option in his mind was to start robbing banks."

Personal life 

Galvan and his wife, whom he met in Ottawa, were married in Hamilton, Bermuda and had at least two children.

Notes

References 

American bank robbers